Linaker is a surname. Notable people with the surname include:

 Hugh Linaker (1872–1938), gardener and landscape gardener
 Johnny Linaker (1927–2013), English footballer
 Kay Linaker (1913–2008), American actress and screenwriter
 Lewis Linaker (1885–1961), English cricketer

See also
 Lineker